Hanka Pachale-Durante (born 12 September 1976 in Schwerin) is a German volleyball player; she played for the German Women's National Team, representing them in consecutive Summer Olympics, starting in 1996. She represented her native country in at the 2004 Summer Olympics, finishing in ninth place, and at the 2003 Women's European Volleyball Championship, finishing third. For the 2009–10 season, she played for Italian club Pavia.

Her father Siegfried Pachale was a discus thrower, placing fifth in the world while representing East Germany in the 1976 Summer Olympics in Montreal, Quebec, Canada. Her mother was also an internationally successful athlete, throwing the discus for the German national team.

Honours
 1996 Olympic Games — 8th place
 1998 World Championship — 13th place
 2000 Olympic Games — 6th place
 2001 European Championship — 9th place
 2003 European Championship — 3rd place
 2004 Olympic Games — 9th place 
 2005 FIVB World Grand Prix — 10th place
 2005 European Championship — 11th place
 2006 World Championship — 11th place
 2007 European Championship — 6th place

References

Sources

External links
 
 
 
 

1976 births
Living people
German women's volleyball players
Volleyball players at the 1996 Summer Olympics
Volleyball players at the 2000 Summer Olympics
Olympic volleyball players of Germany
Sportspeople from Schwerin